Aschehoug is the Danish division of Egmont Books. It is Denmark’s second largest publisher with a revenue of approximately EUR 55 million (2003) and with a strong schoolbook publisher, Alinea, as part of the publishing house. With its schoolbook publisher Alinea and Forlag Malling Beck, Ashcheoug command a strong position in the market for educational materials for Danish elementary and lower secondary schools.

In 1908, Aschehoug expanded with a branch in Copenhagen, which in 1926 came into Danish hands and has since held an important position in the Danish book market. In 1961, Aschehoug was incorporated into the Egmont Group and distinguished himself, especially in the 1990s with many biographies and memoirs. In 2006, the publishing house had 160 employees and a turnover of DKK 470 million. DKK annually.  In 2007, Aschehoug acquired the publishing business of the Swedish Bonnier Group. On that occasion, Aschehoug changed his name to Lindhardt & Ringhof.  

Book publishing companies of Denmark